Chhuttan Lal Meena (3 September 1920 – 8 March 1989) was a member of the Indian parliament. He represented the Sawai Madhopur, India constituency from 1971 to 1977. Prior to his election to the Indian parliament, Meena was a member of the Rajasthan Legislative Assembly from the Mahua and Nadoti assembly constituencies. Meena served in the Indian Army from 1938 to 1951. He was an ally of Farmer leader Kumbaram arya. 
 Meena was born on 3 September 1920 in Alwar district.

References 

1920 births
1989 deaths
Meena people
Indian National Congress politicians from Rajasthan